"I Can Make You Feel Like" is a single recorded by the German Eurodance project Maxx. The single was selected from the project's debut album To The Maxximum as their fourth single for release in May 1995.

In Estonia, the song is well-known for its cover by Üllar Jörberg entitled "Kutse tantsule". Because of this, it has become the subject of numerous parodies and covers in Estonia as well, the most well-known of which was performed by Tanel Padar on the TV show "Su nägu kõlab tuttavalt" (Estonia's adaptation of Your Face Sounds Familiar).

Track listing

Credits
Engineer (mix) – Robert Lee
Engineer (recording) – Luke Steward
Instruments – Dee O'Neil, George Torpey
Lyrics – Dakota O'Neil, Dawhite, Gary Bokoe, George Torpey, The Hitman
Music  – Dakota O'Neil, Dawhite, George Torpey, The Hitman*
Producer – The Movement
Sequence design & acoustic structures – The Movement
Vocals –  Linda Meek

Chart performance

Peak positions

References

External links

 

1994 singles
1994 songs
Maxx songs
Pulse 8 singles
Songs written by Jürgen Wind